The 2023 ICC Men's T20 World Cup Americas Qualifier is a cricket tournament that forms part of the qualification process for the 2024 ICC Men's T20 World Cup. The first stage of the qualification pathway in the Americas region was the sub-regional qualifier, played in Argentina between 25 February and 4 March 2023. The top three teams in the sub-regional qualifier progressed to the Americas regional final, which will be played in Bermuda between 28 September and 8 October 2023, where they were joined by Canada, who competed in the 2022 ICC Men's T20 World Cup Global Qualifier A in Oman. The winner of the Americas Regional Final will qualify for the 2024 ICC Men's T20 World Cup. The West Indies and the United States, who were also the members of the ICC Americas, qualified for the World Cup as hosts.

Bermuda were the first team to advance from the sub-regional qualifier after winning their opening three matches. They went on to win their final game, against Bahamas, to seal a sweep of victories and finish top of the points table. Cayman Islands and Panama were the other two qualifiers from the sub-regional tournament.

Teams

Sub-regional Qualifier

Squads

Charles Trott was ruled out of the Bermuda squad after suffering a broken ankle during a warm-up event in Florida and was replaced by Jarryd Richardson.

Argentina v Bermuda T20I series

Argentina and Bermuda played a two-match T20I series in preparation for the qualifier. Bermuda won both of the matches.

1st T20I

2nd T20I

Points table

 Advanced to the regional final

Fixtures

Regional Final

Points table

References

External links
 Series home at ESPNcricinfo (Argentina v Bermuda series)
 Series home at ESPNcricinfo (Sub-regional Qualifier)

ICC Men's T20 World Cup Qualifier
Qualifier